Bernt Assar Rönnlund (3 September 1935 – 5 January 2011)   was a Swedish cross-country skier. Rönnlund's biggest success was at the 1962 FIS Nordic World Ski Championships in Zakopane where he won two gold medals (15 km and 4 × 10 km) and a silver (50 km). As a result, he earned the Svenska Dagbladet Gold Medal that year for his championship successes. Rönnlund was the anchorman of the Swedish 4 × 10 km relay team at the 1964 Winter Olympics in Innsbruck, bringing the team from fourth place to victory. Rönnlund also won the Vasaloppet in 1967 and the 50 km event at the Holmenkollen ski festival twice (1962 and 1968). For his cross-country skiing successes, Rönnlund was awarded the Holmenkollen Medal in 1968 (shared with King Olav V, Gjermund Eggen and Bjørn Wirkola).

After retiring from active competition he was hired in 1972 by The Swedish Radio Corporation as a cross-country skiing commentator. He gained nationwide popularity working in a duo with Åke Strömmer. Rönnlund retired from broadcasting after the 2003 FIS Nordic World Ski Championships.

Rönnlund was married to Inga-Britt Rönnlund and they had three sons, Michael, Lars and Tommy Rönnlund. Later he married Toini Gustafsson, a 1967 Holmenkollen medalist; they had two children together, plus one from the previous marriage of Gustafsson. They became the second husband-wife team to earn this honor. They are also the only husband-wife team to ever win the Svenska Dagbladet Gold Medal with Gustafsson earning the honor in 1968.

Rönnlund died on 5 January 2011 after a period of illness.

Cross-country skiing results
All results are sourced from the International Ski Federation (FIS).

Olympic Games
 3 medals – (1 gold, 2 silver)

World Championships
 3 medals – (2 gold, 1 silver)

References

External links

 – click on "Holmenkollmedaljen" for downloadable pdf file 
 – click on "Vinnere" for downloadable pdf file 

1935 births
2011 deaths
People from Umeå Municipality
Cross-country skiers from Västerbotten County
Cross-country skiers at the 1960 Winter Olympics
Cross-country skiers at the 1964 Winter Olympics
Cross-country skiers at the 1968 Winter Olympics
Holmenkollen medalists
Holmenkollen Ski Festival winners
Olympic cross-country skiers of Sweden
Olympic gold medalists for Sweden
Swedish male cross-country skiers
Vasaloppet winners
Olympic medalists in cross-country skiing
FIS Nordic World Ski Championships medalists in cross-country skiing
Medalists at the 1964 Winter Olympics
IFK Umeå skiers
Medalists at the 1968 Winter Olympics
Olympic silver medalists for Sweden